Veyrines-de-Vergt is a commune in the Dordogne department in Nouvelle-Aquitaine in southwestern France.

Population

See also 
Communes of the Dordogne department

References 

Communes of Dordogne